An Airport Security Unit is a generic name for an organization that provides security at an airport.  Among these groups are:

Airport Security Unit (Hong Kong)
Airport Security Unit at Beirut Rafic Hariri International Airport in Beirut, Lebanon
Rhode Island Airport Police Department at the Theodore Francis Green State Airport in Rhode Island
Aetos Security Management at the Singapore Changi Airport
SATS Security Services at the Singapore Changi Airport